Kauda is a town in southern Sudan, located in the South Kordofan wilayah which currently serves as headquarters of rebels from the Sudan Revolutionary Front.

History 
On 19 December 2013, the Sudanese army bombed Kauda, killing one person and wounding another.

In 2020, Sudanese Prime Minister Abdallah Hamdok visited Kauda for the first time since war broke out in 2011.

Religion 
There is a mosque in the town. A Catholic community also exists.

References 

Populated places in South Kordofan